Wiang Ko Sai National Park is a national park in Northern Thailand. It covers parts of the Wang Chin District of Phrae Province and Mae Tha, Thoen and Sop Prap Districts of Lampang Province.

Description
Wiang Kosai National Park, with an area of 256,115 rai ~  is located in one of the mountain chains of the Phi Pan Nam Range, with the highest peak, Doi Mae Tom, reaching 1,267 m. The sources of many rivers, such as Mae Koeng, Mae Chok, Mae Sin and Mae Pak, are in these mountains. 
The park has two famous waterfalls, Mae Koeng Luang and Mae Koeng Noi, as well as the Mae Chok hot spring.

Flora and fauna
The mountains are largely covered with dry evergreen and mixed deciduous forest.
The park used to be one of the few protected areas in Thailand where Asian elephants roamed in their natural habitat; formerly Tigers were also abundant in the mountains, but there have been no sightings in recent years. Currently animals in the park area include the Indian Muntjac, the Tree Shrew and the Indochinese Flying Squirrel.

See also
List of national parks of Thailand
List of Protected Areas Regional Offices of Thailand

References

External links
Wiang Kosai National Park - Thaiforestbooking

Tourist attractions in Lampang province
Tourist attractions in Phrae province
National parks of Thailand
Protected areas established in 1981
Geography of Lampang province
Geography of Phrae province
1981 establishments in Thailand
Phi Pan Nam Range